Connie Francis and Hank Williams Jr. sing Great Country Favorites is a studio album of country duets recorded by American entertainer Connie Francis and musician Hank Williams Jr.

The album was recorded May 11–13, 1964 at Owen Bradley's studio Bradley Film & Recording in Nashville. Arrangements were provided by Bill McElhiney who also conducted the sessions. Background vocals came from Millie Kirkham and The Jordanaires.

Track listing

Side A

Side B

Not included songs from the sessions

References

Connie Francis albums
Hank Williams Jr. albums
1964 albums
MGM Records albums
Vocal duet albums
Albums produced by Danny Davis (country musician)
Albums conducted by Bill McElhiney
Albums arranged by Bill McElhiney